The Sunnyside Hotel is a historic house in Magnolia Springs, Alabama, U.S.. It was built in 1897 for Christopher McLennan. It was converted into a hotel by the new owner, Mrs William Harding, in 1913. In the 1940s, it was inherited by her sister and brother-in-law, who used it as a private home until the 1980s, when they sold it to new owners. In 1996, it was sold to David Worthington. It has been listed on the National Register of Historic Places since February 20, 1998.

It is also included in the Magnolia Springs Historic District, as a contributing building.

References

Houses on the National Register of Historic Places in Alabama
Victorian architecture in Alabama
Houses completed in 1897
Houses in Baldwin County, Alabama
Hotel buildings on the National Register of Historic Places in Alabama